Jombozeh is a village in Emamzadeh Abdol Aziz Rural District, Jolgeh District, Isfahan County, Isfahan Province, Iran. At the 2006 census, its population was 54, in 13 families.

References 

Populated places in Isfahan County